This article shows the results of local elections for Preston City Council, in Lancashire held on 10 June 2004

Preston Council is elected "in thirds" which means there is an all out election in one year followed by single-member elections in subsequent years in which one councillor from each of the three-member wards and one councillor from selected two-member wards defend their seat. In these elections in 2004 the share of the vote is compared with the 2003 elections, whilst any gain or loss of a seat is compared with the all out 2002 elections.

Those councillors elected in 2004 will defend their seats in 2008.

In summary, Labour won 7 wards, with a total of 10,445 votes (28% across the city), the Conservatives 7 wins, with 14,754 votes in total, 39% across the city. The Liberal Democrats won 3 wards, gaining 9,181 (24%) votes across the city, whilst an independent won one seat. Candidates from Respect, and the England First party, failed to win seats in 2004.

In an Election Commission trial this was an "all postal" vote.

References
Preston election result 2004
Ward results

See also
Preston local elections
Preston (UK Parliament constituency)
Fulwood, Lancashire
2006 United Kingdom local elections

2004 English local elections
2004
2000s in Lancashire